Tom X. Chao is a comedic playwright, actor, and musician based in New York City whose works have been produced in the United States and Canada. Chao regularly stars in his own work, usually playing an unflattering autobiographical character named "Tom." During the 1990s, Chao was a member of New York City's Art Stars alternative performance scene, and The New York Times called him "a dryly funny downtown comedian," and Time Out New York labeled him a "hilariously angsty writer-performer." He is best known for his play Cats Can See the Devil, which appears in Plays and Playwrights 2004.

In 2016, Chao began collaborating with award-winning playwright-performer Kim Katzberg on a full-length show entitled Hot for Feminist Theory Professor. In June–July 2017, the duo performed a 40-minute excerpt at the This Is Not Normal festival of The Brick Theater, Brooklyn, NY.

Plays

The Negative Energy Field 
Chao's first production, an experimental one-act play in which he also starred. The lead character spends the entirety of the show delivering existential monologues while lying under a large piece of black cloth, until he is challenged by an otherworldly woman in a white dress. Chao created The Negative Energy Field as part of his Masters thesis in performance art at New York University's Gallatin School of Individualized Study, premiering it in 1996 at Pink, Inc. in New York City, with Shawn Sides originating the role of the Woman in the White Dress. It was subsequently produced at Dixon Place, the New York International Fringe Festival, and elsewhere.

Summer, Deepening Then Gone 
Chao's first produced work to include a full cast and the only in which he has never played a role, Summer, Deepening Then Gone involves a teenage girl who magically summons an unwitting poet to protect her from the unwanted advances of a suitor. It debuted in 1999 at HERE in New York City under the original title The Universe of Despair before being retitled for later productions. Script published on Indietheaternow.com in May 2016 (no longer available).

Can't Get Started 
A one-act play in which a young woman tries to help a hapless King Crimson fan understand relationships, Can't Get Started premiered at the St. Marks Theater in 2000 as Chao's first work as an artist-in-residence at New York's Horse Trade Theater Group. An early performance of the play was included in the video archive series of New York City experimental theater NotPerformanceArt. Can't Get Started later saw multiple productions in Canada, one featuring Chao at the 2006 Edmonton International Fringe Festival, and a revival with a new cast for the 2011 Winnipeg Fringe Theatre Festival.

Cats Can See the Devil 
An absurdist comedy in which an experimental theater production—involving a puppet show in which all the characters are abstract shapes—devolves into a scathing deconstruction of its creator and his failed romantic life when he's confronted and ridiculed by a series of women. Cats Can See the Devil premiered in 2003 at the New York International Fringe Festival in a production starring Chao and directed by John Harlacher, with choreography by Tony Award nominee Alex Timbers. The cast included Krista Worth (AKA Krista Watterworth), later the host of HGTV shows Save My Bath and Splurge & Save. The play was published in the 2004 edition of the Plays and Playwrights anthology series, and monologues from it were excerpted in several books, including The Best Men's Stage Monologues of 2004. The original working script for Cats Can See the Devil is in the collection of the New York Public Library for the Performing Arts.

Callous Cad 
A 2009 semi-autobiographical work in which Chao stars as himself on the occasion of a visit by a magical being come to celebrate Tom's first true love. Instead, the Being finds Tom unsatisfied and morose, and she attempts to determine why. Rosalie Purvis originated the role of the Magical Being. In a 2011 revival of the play, Charlotte Pines (previously seen in Play Dead (show) by Todd Robbins and Teller (magician)) was nominated for a New York Innovative Theatre Award for outstanding actress in a lead role for her performance as the Magical Being, a production that The New York Times called "intriguing... droll and ruminative." Script published on Indie Theater Now in September 2016 (no longer available).

Acting 
Chao frequently appears in his own plays, usually as himself. Aside from his own work, Chao's acting appearances include Deb Margolin's Critical Mass, Jen Mitas and Hilary Koob-Sassen's feature film The Bioengine, John Harlacher's feature film Urchin, a recreation of the lost 1932 film Charlie Chan's Chance, and the radio comedy Special Relativity. In the early 1990s, Chao appeared as an extra in two feature films by his USC Cinema classmate, Gregg Araki. (Credited with "Special Thanks" in Totally Fucked Up (1993).)

On February 27, 2018, Chao reprised his role as the Stage Manager (and other roles) in a benefit staged reading of Margolin’s Critical Mass at Dixon Place, almost 21 years after the original production at P.S. 122 in 1997. For this reading, several members of the original cast (including former MTV VJ Kevin Seal) were reunited, along with new additions Jim Turner (of Duck's Breath Mystery Theatre) and Dale Goodson.

Music 
Tom X. Chao composed and performed original songs for several of his plays. In 2008 he released a four-song EP of original music, The Only Record. It was followed by singles in 2010 and 2012.

List of works

Full-Length Plays 
 The Negative Energy Field, New York, Pink Inc., 1996.
 Summer, Deepening Then Gone, (née The Universe of Despair), New York, HERE, 1999.
 Can't Get Started, New York, The St. Marks Theater, 2000.
 The Scientists, New York, Surf Reality, 2001.
 Cats Can See the Devil, New York, UNDER St. Marks, 2003.
 Callous Cad, New York, Dixon Place, 2009.

Short Plays 
 "Please Don't Eat My Lucky Pear," New York, Dixon Place, 1998.
 "Tom Chao's Sketch Comedy Troupe," New York, DTX, 2001.
 "The Relationship Expert," New York, The St. Marks Theater, 2002.
 "How to Invoke Pan" (with Craig Heimbichner), New York, Brick Theater, 2004.
 "Jaded Individual," New York, Prospect Theater, 2004.
 "Freak Out Under the Apple Tree," Montreal, CFCF-CTV Stage, 2005.
 "The Peculiar Utterance of the Day," New York, The Red Room, 2007.
 "The Alternative Lifestyle Fair," New York, Ontological-Hysteric Theater, 2008.
 "The King Looks Out for Your Well-Being," Astoria, New York, One-Minute Play Festival, 2010.
 "My Sister's Magnetic Personality," Ottawa, Ottawa Fringe Festival, 2014.
 "40th Anniversary of the Womyn's Empowering Movement Lab," New York, New Ohio Theatre, One-Minute Play Festival, 2016.
 "Man v. Food v. Humanity," New York, New Ohio Theatre, One-Minute Play Festival, 2017.

Music 
 The Only Record, 2008.
 "Woman, I'm an A*****e," 2010.
 "I Wish I Were Pretty," 2012.

Podcasts 
 The Peculiar Utterance of the Day, libsyn, 2006–2008.
 Tom X. Chao’s New Podcast, Posthaven, 2011-2013.
 Tom X. Chao's Podcast, Soundcloud, 2013–2014.

References

External links 
 Tom X. Chao on Indie Theater Now
 Tom X. Chao on doollee.com: The Playwrights Database

American dramatists and playwrights
Writers from New York City
USC School of Cinematic Arts alumni
New York University Gallatin School of Individualized Study alumni
Musicians from New York City
Male actors from New York City
Year of birth missing (living people)
Living people